Gwaun y Llwyni is a subsidiary summit of Aran Fawddwy in southern Snowdonia, Wales. It forms a part of the Aran mountain range.

The peak's southern face is very steep and forms one of the backwalls of Cwm Cywarch. The summit is grassy and is marked by a small cairn. Pen yr Allt Uchaf rises on the other side of Cwm Cywarch, Aran Fawddwy is to the north-east, Waun Camddwr to the north and Glasgwm to the west.

References

External links
 www.geograph.co.uk : photos of Aran Fawddwy and surrounding area

Mawddwy
Mountains and hills of Gwynedd
Mountains and hills of Snowdonia
Hewitts of Wales
Nuttalls